Greenstreet is a surname which may refer to:

Ivor Greenstreet (born 1966), Ghanaian lawyer and politician
Lionel Greenstreet (1889–1979), British sailor and trans-Antarctic explorer
Mark Greenstreet (born 1960), English actor
Steven Greenstreet (born 1979), American documentary filmmaker
Sydney Greenstreet (1879–1954), English character actor (known for performances in The Maltese Falcon and Casablanca)